There are 216 administrative communes of Mauritania recognised by the Government of Mauritania.

Urban

Agricultural
 
 Adel Bagrou
 Aere Mbar
 Aghchorguitt
 Ain Ehel Taya
 Aioun
 Ajar
 Aleg
 Amourj
 Aoueinat Zbel
 Aoujeft
 Arr
 Atar
 Azgueilem Tiyab
 Bababe
 Bagrou
 Barkeol
 Bassiknou
 Bethet Meit
 Boghé
 Bokkol
 Bou Lahrath
 Bougadoum
 Bouheida
 Bouhdida
 Boulenoir
 Bouly
 Boumdeid
 Bousteila
 Boutilimitt
 Cheggar
 Chinguitti
 Dafor
 Daghveg
 Dar El Barka
 Dionaba
 Djeol
 Djiguenni
 El Ghabra
 El Ghaire
 Fassala
 Foum Gleita
 Ghabou
 Gouraye
 Gueller
 Guerou
 Hamod
 Hassichegar
 Jidr-El Mouhguen
 Kaédi
 Kamour
 Kankossa
 Keur-Macene
 Kobeni
 Koumbi Saleh
 Lahraj
 Legrane
 Leouossy
 Lexeiba
 Maghama
 Magta-Lahjar
 Male
 Mbagne
 Mbalal
 Mbout
 Mederdra
 Monguel
 Moudjeria
 Nbeika
 Ndiago
 Néma
 Niabina
 Noual
 Ouad Naga
 Ouadane
 Oualata
 Oueid Jrid
 Ould Yenge
 Rdheidhi
 Rkiz
 Sangrave
 Sélibaby
 Soudoud
 Tachott
 Tamchekett
 Tawaz
 Tekane
 Tichit
 Tidjikja
 Tiguent
 Timbedra
 Timzinn
 Tintane
 Touil
 Tufunde Cive
 Wahatt
 Woumpou

Industrial and commercial
 
 Arafat
 Benichab
 Choum
 Dar-Naim
 El Mina
 Kiffa
 Ksar
 Nouadhibou
 Riyad
 Rosso
 Sebkha
 Tevragh-Zeina
 Teyarett
 Toujouonine
 Zoueratt

Rural

Agricultural

 
 Agharghar
 Agharghar
 Aghoratt
 Agoueinit
 Ain Savra
 Ain Varba
 Ajoueir
 Aouleiguatt
 Aweintat I
 Bagodine
 Baidiyam
 Bangou
 Bareina
 Beileguet Litama
 Benamane
 Beribavatt
 Blajmil
 Boeir Tores
 Bouanze
 Boubacar Ben Amer
 Boutalhaya
 Chelkhet Tiyad
 Daw
 Devaa
 Dhar
 Diadibeny Gandega
 Dielwar
 Dodol Cover
 Doueirara
 Edbaye El Hejaj
 Edebaye Ehl Guelay
 Egjert
 El Aria
 El Khatt
 El Medah
 El Megve
 El Melgua
 El Mouyessar
 El Verea
 Elb Address
 Feireni
 Ganki
 Gasra El Barka
 Ghlig Ehel Boye
 Gogui
 Guateidoume
 Hassi Abdallah
 Hassi Attilla
 Hassi El Ahmed Bichna
 Hassimhadi
 Hsey Tine
 Inal
 Jreif
 Kouroudel
 Ksar el Barka
 Laftah
 Lahrach
 Leghligue
 Lehreijat
 Lehseira
 Lekhcheb
 Leweynatt
 Lexeiba
 Maaden
 Mabrouk I
 Mabrouk II
 Megva
 Melga
 Melzem Teichett
 Modibougou
 N' Savenni
 Nebaghia
 Nere Walo
 Nouamleine
 Nteichitt
 Ntrguent
 Ouad Amour
 Ould Birem
 Ouldmbouni
 Oum Avnadech
 Oum Lahyadh
 Radhi
 Sagne
 Sani
 Sava
 Soufa
 Taguilalett
 Tarenguet Ehel Moul
 Tektaka. 
 Tenaha
 Tenhemad
 Tensigh
 Tikobra
 Tinghadej
 Tmeimichatt
 Tokomadji
 Toutel
 Voulaniya
 Vrea Litama
 Wali
 Nouamghar

External links
Official site

 
Subdivisions of Mauritania
Mauritania, Communes
Mauritania 3
Communes, Mauritania
Mauritania geography-related lists